The Grammy Award for Best Regional Roots Music Album is an award presented at the Grammy Awards, a ceremony that was established in 1958 as the Gramophone Awards, to recording artists for releasing albums in the regionally based traditional American music, including Hawaiian, Native American, polka, zydeco and Cajun music genres. Honors in several categories are presented at the ceremony annually by the National Academy of Recording Arts and Sciences of the United States to "honor artistic achievement, technical proficiency and overall excellence in the recording industry, without regard to album sales or chart position".

The category was introduced in 2012 in which the previous Best Hawaiian Music Album, Best Zydeco or Cajun Music Album and Best Native American Music Album categories were combined. The change was the result of a major overhaul of Grammy categories, announced in April 2011. The new category also recognizes other American roots forms, such as polka, whose own Grammy category was discontinued in 2009. In 2021, the category added the inclusion of Go-go music.

Hawaiian musician Kalani Pe'a holds the record of most wins in the category with three.

Recipients 

 Each year is linked to the article about the Grammy Awards held that year.

References

External links 
 Official Site of the Grammy Awards

Awards established in 2012
Regional Roots Music Album
Album awards
Grammy Award for Best Regional Roots Music Album